The Bjørvika Line is a tram line in Sentrum and Gamleby in Oslo. It opened as a rerouting of the Gamleby Line. The former route was closed down on the same day of this line's opening. It has two stops, Bjørvika and Middelalderparken. It runs along Dronning Eufemias gate and Bispegata, instead of through Schweigaards gate and Munkegata.  It is served by lines 13 and 19. Line 13 operates between Bekkestua and Ljabru, while Line 19 operates between Majorstuen and Ljabru.

The section in Dronning Eufemias gate was constructed in the early 2010s, but the section between Bjørvika and Oslo Hospital, was only completed in 2021. The reason for this is the construction of the Follo Line project.

Route
It starts from Dronningens gate tram stop, through Prinsens gate and past the Bjørvika Public Library. It goes along Dronning Eufemias gate until it stops at Bjørvika. Afterwards, it follows down Dronning Eufemias gate through Bispegata before heading to Middelalderparken. From Middelalderparken, it continues through Bispegata and Oslo gate before merging with the Ekeberg Line at Oslo Hospital.

See also
 Bjørvika
 Bjørvika tram stop
 Gamleby Line
 Middelalderparken tram stop

External links

https://sporveien.com/inter/nyheter#/pressreleases/endelig-trikk-i-dronning-eufemias-gate-3040054

References

Oslo Tramway lines